Narrawallee is a coastal village in the South Coast region of New South Wales, Australia. The village, along with its southern neighbours Mollymook and Mollymook Beach are generally considered part of the Milton-Ulladulla district within the City of Shoalhaven local government area. Narrawallee is predominantly a residential suburb, bordered by a tidal inlet to the north and Matron Porter Drive. The name "Narrawallee" is taken from the creek which flows eastwards from Milton and its estuary on the Tasman Sea and is itself a corruption of the Aboriginal words  Nurrawerree or Narra Warra.

History
The first inhabitants and traditional landowners of the area were the Budawang indigenous people. European activity in Narrawallee began in 1924 when a  gauge tramway was constructed to transport silica from deposits near Conjola to a jetty at Bannister Head. This involved the construction of a bridge across the mouth of Narrawallee inlet using local timbers at a cost of £2600. Silica transported on the tramway was crushed at a facility at Bannister Head, then shipped to steelworks at Newcastle and Port Kembla. The tramline survived until due to a downturn in production during World War II the rails were lifted in 1943 and the bridge dismantled the following year. Remnants of the bridge supports are still visible on the northern side of Narrawallee inlet.

Present day
Popular due to its coastal setting, development in the modern village of Narrawallee began in the 1960s and 70s and is made up of a mix of permanent residences, holiday rentals and weekenders. Residential development is set back from Narrawallee Beach, providing a public foreshore reserve. During summer holiday periods, lifeguards from the Mollymook Surf Lifesaving Club patrol the southern end of the beach. A boat ramp at Narrawallee Inlet allows small vessels to be launched depending on tides and public restrooms, picnic and barbecue areas are also provided. The reserve provides opportunities for activities such as bush walking and fishing, as well as recreational water sports and is popular with families as the estuary is protected from the rough surf.

The village is served six days a week by local bus services to both Milton and Ulladulla by Ulladulla Bus Lines route 740. The Milton-Ulladulla Baptist Church is located in Narrawallee.

References

City of Shoalhaven
Towns in the South Coast (New South Wales)
Coastal towns in New South Wales